= Peace Science Research Center of Nanjing University =

Peace Science Research Center is a peace studies organization under School of History, Nanjing University. The organization is an extension center which was dedicated to cause attention of peace issue in Nanjing City and promoted the peace education, researches and organized events. The most significant accomplishment is the application of international peaceful city for Nanjing in 2017 and certified by World Peace Association. It is also the first city in China to join the organization.

== History ==
Since 2001, Nanjing started to develop the culture of peace. In 2004, Chen Liu, the professor of School of History, Nanjing University, lead his team compile the Peace Science text book from elementary school to graduate school. They translate the 10 most representative Peace Studies books; take Peace Science to society and campus.

In April 2016, Peace Science Research Center of Nanjing University was founded. Chen Liu, the professor of School of History was the first director. On March 1, 2017, United Nations Educational, Scientific and Cultural Organization qualified Nanjing University for the UNESCO Chair on Peace Studies. Nanjing University gears to international standards by doing research and training also encourage the cooperation of international professionals and Peace Science Research Center. On September 4, 2017, the "International Peace City Association" announced to the world that Nanjing became the 169th international peaceful city, and it is also the first city in China to join the organization. On August 9, 2019, Peace Science Research Center held C9 International Summer School and NARPI Peace Summer Camp aim to widen global horizon and improve practical experience of C9 students by communicating cooperating with students and experts from other countries. Facilitated by Peace Science Research Center, UNESCO and Nanjing signed MOU on September 21, 2020, co-hosted the Nanjing Peace Forum for three consecutive years. The first Nanjing Peace Forum was held in the same year in Nanjing.
